Plas or Plass may refer to:

People
 Plas Johnson (born 1931), American saxophonist
 Adrian Plass (born 1948), British author who writes primarily Christian humor
 Gilbert Plass (1920–2004), Canadian-born physicist
 Maria Plass (born 1953), Swedish Moderate Party politician
 Thierry Plas (born 1959), Belgian guitarist, producer and composer

Other
 Plas, a song by Albanian composer Flori Mumajesi
 Plass, an American automobile manufactured only in 1897
 Roald Dahl Plass, referred to as "The Plas", site of the Wales Millennium Centre in Cardiff
 PLAS, plasma round, weapon of the Armadillo vehicle in the defunct online computer game Terra

See also
 
 
 Michel Plasse (1948–2006), Canadian ice hockey goaltender